Paczkowski  (with its female form Paczkowska ) is a Polish surname. It is of toponymic origin, deriving either from Paczkowo or Paczków, the names of several small settlements in north central and south western Poland respectively.

Notable people with the name Paczkowski include:

 Andrzej Paczkowski (born 1938), Polish historian
 Jacek Paczkowski (born 1981), Polish footballer
 John Paczkowski (born 1969), American journalist and blogger
 Paweł Paczkowski, Polish handball player
 Ray Paczkowski (born 1974), American keyboardist

References

Polish-language surnames
Polish toponymic surnames